The Marine Society & Sea Cadets is seafarers' charity in the United Kingdom and the national organisation for sea cadets. It was formed in 2004 when the Sea Cadets and The Marine Society merged. It is a registered charity in England, Wales and Scotland.

Activities
The MSSC oversees the Sea Cadet Corps, a British voluntary uniformed youth cadet organisation. It consists of about 400 units and 15,000 young people learning nautical and life skills. The first Sea Cadet Unit was established in Whitstable in 1856.

Its headquarters is in Lambeth, in London, in the former Archbishop Temple Boys School. ( approx)

See also
Sea Scouts
Volunteer Cadet Corps

References

External links

Sea Cadets UK

Youth charities based in the United Kingdom
Charities based in London
2004 establishments in the United Kingdom
Organizations established in 2004